The Convocation Center is a 4,080-seat multi-purpose arena in San Antonio, Texas, USA, on the Main Campus of the University of Texas at San Antonio. It was built in 1975 and is home to the UTSA Roadrunners men's and women's basketball teams and women's volleyball team. It hosted the Southland Conference men's basketball tournament in 1992 and 2004. It has hosted many concerts, with acts like Bad Company, AC/DC and Black Sabbath. 

The Convocation Center is often called "The Convo" among the students and athletes of the university. It is also known as the "Historic Convo" and "Bird Cage" to both students and alumni.

See also
 List of NCAA Division I basketball arenas

References

External links
UTSA Convocation Center Information

UTSA Roadrunners basketball
College basketball venues in the United States
Basketball venues in Texas
Sports venues in San Antonio
Indoor arenas in Texas
Volleyball venues in Texas
1975 establishments in Texas